A total of seven bids were initially submitted for the 2026 Winter Olympics. Four of the bids were subsequently withdrawn after entering the candidature stage, leaving Milan–Cortina d'Ampezzo, Italy and Stockholm–Åre, Sweden as the only two remaining candidate bids. Milan–Cortina d'Ampezzo was elected as the host city at the 134th IOC Session in Lausanne, Switzerland, on 24 June 2019.

Bidding process
The IOC Executive Board met in Lausanne to discuss the 2026 bidding process on 9 June 2017; and a new approach was approved at the Extraordinary IOC Session on 11–12 July 2017. The IOC will take a more proactive role in assisting and supporting cities considering a candidature for the 2026 Olympics, and will customise its approach to the needs of the cities in order for them to develop the best value proposition. These measures will lead to a simplified process for the cities, with reduced costs. The Invitation Phase has been extended to one year, starting 13 September 2017, and the Candidature Phase has been shortened to one year, starting from 2018 to 2019. These measures were enacted due to a lack of interest in bidding for the 2026 Games well into 2017.

Dialogue stage
 Launch of dialogue stage (29 September 2017)
 Joint briefing through video conference (13 October 2017)
 Signing of candidature cooperation agreement (Before scheduling first IOC expert support visits or interactive working session)
 Customised on-site expert support visits (November 2017 – April 2018)
 On-site interactive working session 1: Presentation and discussion of initial Games concept (25 November – 15 December 2017)
 Observer programme at the 2018 Winter Olympics in PyeongChang, South Korea (9–23 February 2018)
 Deadline for cities to enter the candidature process by joining dialogue stage (31 March 2018)
 On-site interactive working session 2: Presentation of consolidated Games concept after consultation with IOC technical experts (May 2018)
 Official debrief between PyeongChang Organising Committee and Beijing Organising Committee (June 2018)
 Provision of host city contract (July 2018)
 IOC Working Group Report submitted to IOC Executive Board (September 2018)
 IOC Executive Board to recommend to the IOC Session cities to invite to the candidature stage (October 2018)
 IOC Session to invite a number of interested cities to take part in the candidature stage (October 2018)

Candidature stage
 Deadline for the submission of the Candidature File but without core guarantees by the candidate cities (11 January 2019)
 IOC expert pre-visits (February 2019)
 IOC Evaluation Commission analysis including a visit to each candidate city and requests for submission of any additional information or guarantees (March/April 2019)
 Stockholm–Åre 2026 (12–16 March 2019)
 Milan–Cortina 2026 (2–6 April 2019)
 Deadline for the submission of the complete Guarantee File (12 April 2019)
 Final Q&A session with the Evaluation Commission via individual video conference (May 2019)
 Publication of the Evaluation Commission Report on www.olympic.org (May 2019)
 Candidate cities' right of response following publication of the Evaluation Commission Report (June 2019)
 Candidate City Briefing 2026 for IOC Members and International Olympic Winter Sports Federations (June 2019)
 Candidate cities present to IOC Session in Lausanne, followed by election of the Host City 2026 (24 June 2019)
 Individual debriefing with each NOC / candidate city (6–9 months after the election)

IOC's 2026 Evaluation Commission
In October 2018, the IOC appointed the following members and stakeholder representatives to the Evaluation Commission that will assess the candidate cities for the 2026 Olympic and Paralympic Games.
  Octavian Morariu: Chair
  Kristin Kloster Aasen: IOC member
  Zhang Hong: IOC member
  Roman Kumpost: Stakeholder representative
  Heike Größwang: Stakeholder representative
  Marianna Davis: Stakeholder representative
  Lee Hee-beom: Stakeholder representative
  José Luis Marco: Stakeholder representative

Milan–Cortina d'Ampezzo was selected as host city of the 2026 Winter Olympics after beating Stockholm–Åre by 13 votes on 24 June 2019 at the 134th IOC Session in Lausanne, Switzerland. The host city was originally due to be selected on 11 September 2019, at the 134th IOC Session in Milan; however, IOC rules required that the election be moved to a different location after Italy submitted a bid for the 2026 Games that included the city.

Final selection process

The IOC voted to select the host city of the 2026 Winter Olympics on 24 June 2019 at the 134th IOC Session in Lausanne, Switzerland.

Criteria
A firm criterion for the Winter Olympics is the availability of alpine ski slopes of certain sizes, which narrows down potential locations significantly, and often necessitates locations in less populated areas.

A certain spectator capacity is required, which is most often 10,000 but varies according to the particular sport. Furthermore, certain VIP areas are required at every venue.

Candidate cities
On 2 July 2018, the IOC announced that it would contribute US$925 million to the host city in order to help reduce costs.

Cities in dialogue stage 
The following cities participated in the dialogue stage. Four of these (Calgary, Sapporo, Sion, and Stockholm) joined the dialogue stage at its launch on 29 September 2017, and took part in the PyeongChang 2018 Observer Programme. The other cities joined in time for the deadline (31 March 2018) for entering the candidature stage.

 Milan–Cortina d'Ampezzo, Italy
 Stockholm–Åre, Sweden
  (withdrew on 19 November 2018)
  (was not invited to candidature stage on 4 October 2018)
  (withdrew on 13 September 2018)
  (withdrew on 6 July 2018)
  (withdrew on 10 June 2018 after rejection in referendum)

Cities in candidature stage 
Three of the four cities that still remained in the dialogue stage in October 2018 were invited by the IOC to join the candidature stage; these were Calgary, Stockholm, and the joint Milan–Cortina d'Ampezzo bid. Erzurum was the only city remaining in the dialogue stage that was not invited to advance. Calgary withdrew its bid on 19 November 2018, and Stockholm created a joint bid with Åre on 11 January 2019 to become Stockholm–Åre 2026.

The candidate cities were required to fulfill their governmental requirements by 11 January 2019.

Withdrawn from dialogue stage
The following cities were seen as potential bids and took part in the dialogue stage, but have withdrawn for various reasons.

Candidate cities venues list

Previously interested in bidding
The following cities initially explored the possibility of bidding but decided not to proceed to the dialogue stage.

Americas
 Quebec City, Quebec, Canada
Quebec City initially expressed interest in bidding. In September 2011, Quebec City mayor Régis Labeaume ruled out bidding for 2022. However, the city may bid for another Winter Games in the future. Then-IOC President Jacques Rogge stated that he believes that the 2026 Winter Olympics would be a realistic option for the city to organise the Games. Quebec has a problem finding a mountain for the downhill event, as the planned location of Le Massif was not approved. In September 2015, during an interview on Radio-Canada, Labeaume ruled out any possibility of Quebec making a bid for 2026. Labeaume also attempted, but failed, to create a joint bid with Calgary, Canada; Vancouver, Canada; or Lake Placid, United States. Calgary's Mayor Naheed Nenshi had confirmed his city, the 1988 host, were pondering a bid, but the talks on a joint effort appear to have collapsed.

 Multiple cities, United States
On 9 February 2018, the United States Olympic Committee (USOC) ruled out a bid for the 2026 Winter Olympics and will instead consider bids for the 2030 Winter Olympics:
 Boston, Massachusetts, United States
Boston was actively considering a bid for the 2026 Winter Games. This campaign was dropped when Boston was named by the USOC as the United States' candidate city for the 2024 Summer Olympics. However, due to significant public opposition, Boston's campaign for the 2024 Summer Games was later dropped and Los Angeles was chosen as the USOC bid city. (Los Angeles was later awarded the 2028 Games as part of a deal to grant Paris the 2024 event.)
 Bozeman, Montana, United States
The Big Sky Committee for the Winter Games was seeking to bring the Olympics to the Bozeman and Big Sky areas of southwest Montana, immediately north of Yellowstone National Park. The committee, however, has not sought the bid since 2014.
 Lake Placid, New York, United States
Lake Placid, the host of the 1932 Winter Olympics and the 1980 Winter Olympics considered a bid for the 2026 Winter Olympics, but had to drop out when the USOC decided not to launch a bid for the 2026 Games.
 Salt Lake City, Utah, United States
Salt Lake City, the host of the 2002 Winter Olympics, has been considering launching a bid to host the Winter Games for a second time, originally as early as 2022. It was not clear whether Salt Lake City was planning to submit a bid for the 2026 or 2030 Olympics, but it would be dependent on which other cities submitted bids. One obstacle for a bid from Salt Lake City is the fact that Los Angeles will be hosting the 2028 Summer Olympics. The US last hosted back-to-back editions of the Olympics in 1980 (Lake Placid Winter Games) and 1984 (Los Angeles Summer Games). LA 2028 President, Casey Wasserman, stated that an attempt for the United States to host the 2026 Winter Olympics and Paralympics would "require a lot of conversation" with the Californian city before a bid was formally launched. The USOC was expected to discuss possible bids for the 2026 Winter Olympic and Paralympic Games at its board meeting in late October. On 16 October 2017, leaders of Salt Lake City and Utah announced the formation of an official Olympic Exploratory Committee. According to sources, Salt Lake City appeared to be more focused on the 2030 Games and the USOC is monitoring the process to see if the IOC will award both the 2026 and 2030 Winter Games at the 134th IOC Session in Milan, Italy in September 2019, repeating the dual allocation of the 2024 and 2028 Summer Games to Paris and Los Angeles. Later this session has been moved to Lausanne due to surprise Italian bid by just Milan with few other places in the country. On December 14th, 2018, Salt Lake City was selected by the United States Olympic Committee (USOC) for a potential bid to host the Winter Olympics in 2030.

Asia
 Almaty, Kazakhstan
Almaty was reportedly considering a bid to host the 2026 Winter Games after narrowly losing to Beijing in its bid to host the 2022 Winter Olympics. However, Bauyrzhan Baibek, Mayor of Almaty, denied the rumors of Almaty bidding to host the 2026 Winter Olympics.

Europe
 Innsbruck, Austria
On 17 February 2016, the "Tiroler Tageszeitung" wrote in an article that IOC president Thomas Bach asked the alpine city for an application for the 2026 Winter Olympics. He said that an event such as this would not only be celebrated, but lived. If applying, the host of the 1964 Winter Olympics, the 1976 Winter Olympics and the 2012 Winter Youth Olympics would reuse many of the sites that were used in past games. In October 2016, the Austrian Olympic Committee (ÖOC) agreed to carry out a feasibility study into whether they should launch a bid. On 6 December 2016, the ÖOC commissioned a working group including renowned companies to conduct a feasibility study with results published on 22 June 2017. The study proposes to use facilities at venues across all of Tyrol: Innsbruck, Igls, Kühtai, St. Anton am Arlberg, Hochfilzen, and Seefeld. The two ice hockey venues were to be determined, as was the possibility of using the existing speed skating rink in Inzell in Germany. 2026 marks the 50th anniversary of Innsbruck's 1976 Winter Olympics. Innsbruck could be the first city to host the Winter Olympics three times. A referendum vote in Innsbruck was set for 15 October 2017 to decide whether to proceed with the bid. In the referendum, the bid was defeated as 53 percent voted against it. This was the third successive defeat of an Olympic bid by a vote after Kraków and Munich 2022 and Hamburg 2024, while Budapest and Rome 2024 withdrew to avoid a referendum.

 Dresden, Germany
The mayor of Altenberg, Thomas Kirsten, brought Dresden up for discussion in November 2013, after the Bavarians rejected a Munich bid for the 2022 Winter Olympics. But the German Olympic Sports Confederation decided not to consider a bid since the lack of alpine skiing resorts would have made it necessary to use Czech venues.

 Aosta, Italy
A public debate is promoted by a citizens' committee in the Italian region of Mont Blanc, in order to promote Aosta as the host of the Winter Olympics in 2026 or later. The idea was to build support among the citizens and promote the Games from the bottom up, to build a consensus supporting the effort. The Aosta Valley region's economy is mainly based on winter sports. Starting from the 1970s the main winter resorts hosted world events: Courmayeur hosted a round of the 1977 Alpine Skiing World Cup, Cervinia a round of the 1978 Alpine Skiing World Cup, La Thuile a round of the 2016 Alpine Skiing World Cup and bobsleigh's FIBT World Championships 1971, Cogne a round of the 1984–85 FIS Cross-Country World Cup and a round of 2006–07 FIS Cross-Country World Cup and Fénis hosted in the 1986 FIL World Luge Natural Track Championships. In 1991, the city made a bid for the 1998 Winter Olympics but lost to Nagano, so a 2026 bid would be the city's second attempt. In 1993 Aosta hosted the first edition of the winter European Youth Olympic Festival and in 2010 it hosted the first edition of the Winet Military World Games. The Aosta bid was cancelled when it was announced that the city of Milan will be the host city of the 134th IOC Session to decide the host city, and IOC regulations state that no bid from a country is allowed when the IOC session is in the same country.

 Norway:
 Lillehammer, Norway
On 6 April 2017, it was announced that Lillehammer was considering a bid for the Winter Olympics in 2026 or 2030. Lillehammer was host of the 1994 Winter Olympics and the 2016 Winter Youth Olympics. A feasibility report was published in March. It could share an Olympic bid with Norwegian cities like Oslo, Bergen, Stavanger and Trondheim, according to Norwegian media. However, no further information was released about the bid as the Norwegian Olympic and Paralympic Committee and Confederation of Sports  selected the southern Norwegian county of Telemark. On 8 March 2018, Lillehammer renewed its bid to host the Games.
It was confirmed on 30 March 2018 that Lillehammer had ruled out a bid for the 2026 Games, but were likely to target the 2030 Games instead.
 Telemark, Norway
On 31 October 2017, it was announced at a press conference at the top of Mount Gausta that the southern Norwegian county of Telemark, known as the cradle of modern skiing, wanted to host the 2026 Olympics, with a base in the twin UNESCO World Heritage towns Notodden and Rjukan (with the Gaustatoppen alpine ski area) in the North of Telemark, and further fairly spread venues. They also wished for Telemark skiing to be added to the Games. The Norwegian national sports federation turned this location down on 25 January 2018, without suggesting any other Norwegian site.

 Barcelona, Spain
Barcelona (the host city of the 1992 Summer Olympics) had waged a bid for the 2022 Winter Olympics, but, according to mayor Xavier Trias, was not considered ready yet. Instead, one "must concentrate its efforts and commitment to work to reach the Olympic target by 2026". On 17 June 2015, Barcelona announced it will not be bidding to host the 2026 Olympic Winter Games. Mayor Ada Colau who won the municipal elections on 24 May decided that this is not a priority project for the city. On 24 July, the city council accorded to create a specific commission about the social and economic impact of the bid. On 16 March 2017, Barcelona's City Hall government has taken itself out of the running to host the 2026 Winter Olympics. According to Barcelona's deputy mayor, Jordi Collboni, the decision responded "to the current social and economic circumstances not only in Barcelona but in the whole country". Of note, it would have been the second city to host both the Summer and the Winter Olympics after Beijing.
Government officials in Barcelona, Spain are open to the possibility of hosting the 2026 Olympic Winter Games Mundo Deportivo reported after meetings were held between sports administrators and International Olympic Committee (IOC) Vice President Juan Antonio Samaranch.

 Graubünden, Switzerland
The canton of Graubünden released a concept named Graubünden and Partners including potential venues without referring to a dedicated host city. The map of the project presented on 16 December 2016 announced St. Moritz to be host city. Zurich refused even before to be host city of the bid. Voters in the area rejected the bid by more than 60 percent during a public referendum on 12 February 2017. Graubünden failed public referendums to host the 1980 Winter Olympics and the 2022 Winter Olympics as well.

Oceania
  Auckland and Queenstown, New Zealand
A "pre-feasibility" report was published in May 2015 stating that a joint Winter Olympics with Australia would be feasible for 2026. Bruce McGechan, in a news release on 26 June 2015, said that the New Zealand Olympic Committee had considered the report but had decided not to ask the New Zealand Government to do a full feasibility study of hosting the 2026 Winter Olympics. Therefore, the Olympic Winter Games NZ 2026 project was shelved.

References

Further reading 
 
 

 
Winter Olympics bids
June 2019 events in Europe
2019 in Switzerland
Events in Lausanne